Yan Zi and Zheng Jie were the defending champions but both chose not to participate that year.

In the final, Hsieh Su-wei and Peng Shuai defeated Nathalie Dechy and Casey Dellacqua, 6–0, 6–1.

Seeds

Draw

Draw

External links
Draw

Medibank International Sydney - Women's Doubles
Wom